Palitha may refer to

Palitha Fernando, Sri Lankan lawyer
Palitha Kohona, Sri Lankan diplomat
Palitha Perera, cricket commentator
Palitha Thewarapperuma, Sri Lankan politician
Palitha Range Bandara, Sri Lankan politician

Sinhalese masculine given names